KinKi Single Selection is the first greatest hits album by Japanese duo KinKi Kids. The album was released on May 17, 2000 and debuted at the top of the Oricon charts, selling 712,340 copies in its first week. The album eventually went on to sell over 1,200,000 copies by the end of the year and was certified Million by RIAJ.

Track list

References

 KinKi Single Selection. Johnny's net. Retrieved November 1, 2009.

External links
 Official KinKi Kids website

2000 greatest hits albums
KinKi Kids albums